The 2012–13 Indiana State Sycamores basketball team represented Indiana State University during the 2012–13 NCAA Division I men's basketball season. The Sycamores, led by third year head coach Greg Lansing, played their home games at the Hulman Center and were members of the Missouri Valley Conference. They finished the season 18–15, 9–9 in MVC play to finish in fifth place. They advanced to the semifinals of the Missouri Valley tournament where they lost to Creighton. They were invited to the 2013 NIT where they lost in the first round to Iowa.

Roster

Schedule

|-
!colspan=9| Exhibition

|-
!colspan=9| Regular season

|-
!colspan=9| 2013 Missouri Valley Conference tournament

|-
!colspan=9| 2013 NIT

References

Indiana State Sycamores men's basketball seasons
Indiana State
Indiana State
Syca
Syca